Kopanaya 1-ya is a rural locality (a selo) and the administrative center of Kopanyanskoye Rural Settlement, Olkhovatsky District, Voronezh Oblast, Russia. The population was 293 as of 2010. There are 5 streets.

Geography 
It is located 25 km northwest from Olkhovatka.

References 

Rural localities in Olkhovatsky District